Irobi Airport  is an airport serving the San Martin River town of Bella Vista, in the Beni Department of Bolivia. The runway is just east of the town.

See also

Transport in Bolivia
List of airports in Bolivia

References

External links 
OpenStreetMap - Bella Vista
HERE Maps - Bella Vista
Bing Maps - Bella Vista

Airports in Beni Department